The 1933 San Francisco State Golden Gaters football team represented San Francisco State Teachers College—now known as San Francisco State University—as an independent during the 1933 college football season. Led by third-year head coach Dave Cox, San Francisco State compiled a record of 2–6 and was outscored by its opponents 117 to 23. The Golden Gaters were shut out in five games and failed to score more than a touchdown in seven of their eight games. The team played home games at Ewing Field in San Francisco. Although the "Gator" was voted to be the mascot for the team in 1931, local newspaper articles called the team the "Golden Gaters".

Schedule

Notes

References

San Francisco State
San Francisco State Gators football seasons
San Francisco State Golden Gaters football